The following is the solo discography of British rock musician and recording artist Pete Townshend. Townshend's career as a published musician and songwriter began in 1964 as a member of rock band the Who, before branching out as a solo artist in the 1970s.

Studio albums

Live albums

Soundtrack albums

Compilations

Albums

Box sets and samplers

Singles

Other appearances

Demos

Albums

Compilation

Production

Theater and classical

Plays

Adaptations

References

Discography
Rock music discographies
Discographies of British artists